Clayton McMillan is a New Zealand professional rugby union coach.

Born in Perth but raised in Rotorua McMillan was educated at Rotorua Boys High School.  He worked as a Police officer in Rotorua. McMillan represented the Whakarewarewa rugby club and played for Bay of Plenty as a Number 8 from 1995 to 2003, playing over 100 matches. He also represented the New Zealand Divisional team in 2000.

McMillan was named as the interim head coach of the  team that plays in the Super Rugby competition.

He was the coach of  before taking up his role at the Chiefs.

References

Clive Akers & N. A. C. McMillan (1996) New Zealand Rugby Almanack of New Zealand. Hodder Moa Beckett Publishers, Auckland. 

Living people
New Zealand rugby union coaches
Year of birth missing (living people)